The highest known price paid for an artwork by a living artist was for Jasper Johns's 1958 painting Flag. Its 2010 private sale price was estimated to be about US$110 million ($ million in  dollars).

All-time 

This is a list of highest prices ever paid—at auction or private sale—for an artwork by an artist living at time of sale.

Progressive auction sales records 

This is a list of progressive records of the highest price ever paid at auction for the work of an artist who was living at time of sale. As a progressive record listing, it only lists auctions records that topple the previous best. The current record price is US$91 million for Jeff Koons's 1986 sculpture, Rabbit, set in 2019. The current record price for a painting is $90 million for David Hockney's 1972 Portrait of an Artist (Pool with Two Figures), set the prior year.

Private sales 
 Jasper Johns's 1958 Flag painting was sold by Steven A. Cohen to Jean-Christophe Castelli for ca $110 million in 2010 ($ million in  dollars).
 Privately, Damien Hirst's For the Love of God (2007), composed of diamond and platinum, sold to a consortium including the artist in August 2007 for $100 million.($ million in  dollars) 
 Another Jasper Johns painting, False Start (1959), was sold by Kenneth C. Griffin to David Geffen on October 12, 2006, for a then record $80 million.($ million in  dollars)
 The Whitney Museum of American Art privately purchased Jasper Johns's Three Flags in 1980 for $1 million ($ million in  dollars), then a record price for a living artist.
 In 1967, citizens of Basel, Switzerland, raised nearly $2 million to buy two Picasso paintings for their Kunstmuseum Basel.
 In 1890, owner of the Grands Magasins du Louvre department store, purchased Ernest Meissonier's 1814 The Campaign of France from a banker for 850,000 Fr (US$162,000 in 1890; equivalent to $ million in ), the highest price for a painting by an artist alive or dead.

See also 
 List of most expensive paintings
 List of most expensive sculptures
 List of most expensive photographs
 List of most expensive books and manuscripts
 List of most expensive non-fungible tokens

References 

living artists
Contemporary art
Auction-related lists
Record progressions